The Thulamela Local Municipality is a Local municipality in the Limpopo province of South Africa. Its municipal boundaries were greatly altered after the South African municipal elections, 2016 when much of the area that formerly belonged to the municipality, including the town of Malamulele, was incorporated into the newly formed Collins Chabane Local Municipality. It is named after the Thulamela ruins located near the Pafuri Gate of the Kruger National Park.

Main places
The 2011 census divided the municipality into the following main places:

Politics 
The municipal council consists of eighty-one members elected by mixed-member proportional representation. Forty-one councillors are elected by first-past-the-post voting in forty-one wards, while the remaining forty are chosen from party lists so that the total number of party representatives is proportional to the number of votes received. In the election of 3 August 2016 the African National Congress (ANC) won a majority of sixty-four seats on the council.

The following table shows the results of the election.

References

External links
 Official website

Local municipalities of the Vhembe District Municipality